Stephen Anthony Paul Lombardozzi Jr. (born September 20, 1988) is an American professional baseball second baseman and left fielder who is a free agent. He previously played in Major League Baseball (MLB) for the Washington Nationals, Baltimore Orioles, Pittsburgh Pirates and Miami Marlins.

Career

Washington Nationals

Lombardozzi graduated from Atholton High School in 2007. A player on the school's varsity baseball team, he was named a preseason third-team Rawlings high school All-American in 2005. Lombardozzi was playing with the Holyoke Blue Sox in the New England Collegiate Baseball League (NECBL) when he was selected by the Washington Nationals in the 19th round (571st overall) of the 2008 Major League Baseball Draft out of St. Petersburg College.

Lombardozzi spent 2009 with the Class A Hagerstown Suns and recorded a .296 batting average with three home runs, 58 runs batted in (RBIs), and 16 stolen bases in 126 games. Prior to the 2010 season, Lombardozzi was ranked as the Nationals' 15th best prospect. He split the season between the Class-A Advanced Potomac Nationals and Double-A Harrisburg Senators, hitting .293 with six home runs, 49 RBIs, 35 doubles, 11 triples, and 24 stolen bases in 137 games. After reporting back to Harrisburg to start the 2011 season, Lombardozzi earned a promotion to the Triple-A Syracuse Chiefs after hitting .309 in 65 games. He was called up to the majors for the first time on September 6, 2011.

Lombardozzi was granted a spot on the Nationals 25-man roster for the 2012 season after a productive spring. His productivity continued into the regular season with a .333 batting average as a semi-regular through May 20. On June 4, 2013 he hit his first career walk-off, a sacrifice fly in a 3–2 victory over the Mets.

Detroit Tigers
On December 2, 2013, Lombardozzi was traded to the Detroit Tigers, along with pitchers Ian Krol and Robbie Ray, for starting pitcher Doug Fister.

Baltimore Orioles
On March 24, 2014, before playing in a regular-season game with the Tigers, Lombardozzi was traded to the Baltimore Orioles in exchange for Alex Gonzalez. On March 29, 2014 it was announced that Lombardozzi had made the Opening Day roster for the Orioles.  He was optioned to the Triple-A Norfolk Tides on May 1 when Manny Machado returned from the disabled list.

Lombardozzi was outrighted off the Orioles roster on December 8, 2014.

Pittsburgh Pirates
Lombardozzi was acquired by the Pittsburgh Pirates on February 3, 2015.

Chicago White Sox
On October 26, 2015, the Chicago White Sox signed Lombardozzi to a minor league contract with an invitation to spring training. He was released by the White Sox on  March 31, 2016.

Southern Maryland Blue Crabs
On April 17, 2016, Lombardozzi signed with the Southern Maryland Blue Crabs of the Atlantic League of Professional Baseball.

Second stint with Nationals
On June 6, 2016, the Washington Nationals signed Lombardozzi and optioned him to the Triple-A Syracuse Chiefs.

Miami Marlins
On February 28, 2017, Lombardozzi signed a minor league deal with the Miami Marlins.

Oakland Athletics
On January 8, 2018, Lombardozzi signed a minor league deal with the Oakland Athletics. He elected free agency on November 2, 2018.

Long Island Ducks
On March 28, 2019, Lombardozzi signed a deal with the Long Island Ducks of the Atlantic League of Professional Baseball. He became a free agent following the season, but later re-signed with the Ducks for the 2020 season. Lombardozzi also re-signed with the Ducks for the 2021 season. In 2021, Lombardozzi hit .329 with 83 RBIs, 20 stolen bases, and a league-leading 90 walks. He was named the Atlantic League Player of the Year following the season. He became a free agent following the season.

Kane County Cougars
On May 17, 2022, Lombardozzi signed with the Kane County Cougars of the American Association of Professional Baseball. Lombardozzi appeared in 38 games for the Cougars, during which he hit .301 with 2 home runs and 18 RBIs. On July 4, 2022 Lombardozzi was released by the Cougars.

Personal life
His father, Steve Lombardozzi, played in the majors from 1985 to 1990.

See also

List of second-generation Major League Baseball players

References

External links

1988 births
Living people
Algodoneros de Guasave players
American expatriate baseball players in Mexico
Atholton High School alumni
Baseball players from Baltimore
Baltimore Orioles players
Gulf Coast Nationals players
Hagerstown Suns players
Harrisburg Senators players
Indianapolis Indians players
Jupiter Hammerheads players
Long Island Ducks players
Major League Baseball second basemen
Miami Marlins players
Nashville Sounds players
New Orleans Baby Cakes players
Norfolk Tides players
People from Edina, Minnesota
People from Fulton, Maryland
Pittsburgh Pirates players
Potomac Nationals players
Scottsdale Scorpions players
Southern Maryland Blue Crabs players
St. Petersburg Titans baseball players
Syracuse Chiefs players
Washington Nationals players